Acropoma arafurensis is a species of bioluminescent lanternbelly native to the eastern Indian Ocean. It was described from pair of specimens found in the Arafura Sea. The known specimens measure  and are found  around 156-164 m below sea level.

References 

Fish described in 2019
arafurensis